The BBCH-scale (solaneous fruit) identifies the phenological development stages of solaneous fruit (tomato = Lycopersicon esculentum, aubergine = Solanum melongena,
paprika = Capsicum annuum).  It is a plant species specific version of the BBCH-scale.

1 For tomatoes with determinate stem growth, paprika and aubergines. In tomatoes with indeterminate stem growth and only one sympodial branch at the corresponding axis, the apical side shoot formation occurs concurrently with the emergence of the inflorescence (Principal growth stage 5), so that the coding within principal growth stage 2 is not necessary
2 For tomato
3 For paprika and aubergine

References

External links
A downloadable version of the BBCH Scales

BBCH-scale